Nicholas Fenwick (c. 1693–1752) of Pilgrim Street, Newcastle-upon-Tyne, and Lemington, Northumberland  was a British Tory politician who sat in the House of Commons from 1727 to 1747.

Fenwick was the eldest son of Robert Fenwick, merchant and mayor of Newcastle in 1708, and Isabella Ellison, daughter of Cuthbert Ellison of Hebburn, county Durham. He married  Elizabeth Baker, daughter of George Baker of Crook, county Durham on 21 October 1713.  She died in March 1715. He married as his second wife on  9 May 1716, Elizabeth Clavering, daughter of Sir James Clavering, 4th Baronet, of Axwell, county Durham. By her,   he acquired Lemington, in Alnwick, where he practised forestry. He received a gold medal from the Society of Arts for his forestry work.
 
Fenwick was admitted to the Merchant Adventurers Company in 1712. He was Mayor of Newcastle in 1726. At the 1727 British general election he was returned as Tory  Member of Parliament for Newcastle-upon-Tyne. He voted against the Administration in every recorded division. In 1733 he was given a vote of thanks by the Merchant Adventurers for his keen opposition to the Excise Bill.  He was returned again at the 1734 British general election. In 1736 he was Mayor of Newcastle again. He was returned again at the  1741 British general election. He was  Mayor of Newcastle again for the years 1746 and 1747. He retired from Parliament at the  1747 British general election.

Fenwick died in 1752 and was buried on  27 February..He had six son and seven daughters by his second wife.

References

1690s births
1752 deaths
Members of the Parliament of Great Britain for English constituencies
British MPs 1727–1734
British MPs 1734–1741
British MPs 1741–1747
British MPs 1747–1754